Jodi Sue Huisentruit (born June 5, 1968 –  June 27, 1995) was an American television news anchor for KIMT, the CBS affiliate in Mason City, Iowa. She disappeared in the early morning hours of June 27, 1995, soon after telling a colleague that she had overslept and was running late for work. Since there were signs of a struggle outside her apartment, Huisentruit is believed to have been abducted. However, extensive investigations have failed to uncover any clues to her disappearance, and she was declared legally dead in 2001.

Early life
Huisentruit was born and raised in Long Prairie, Minnesota, the youngest daughter of Maurice Nicholas Huisentruit (1920–82) and Imogene L. "Jane" Huisentruit (née Anderson, 1923–2014). In high school, Huisentruit excelled at golf. Considered a promising talent, she and her team won the state Class A tournament in both 1985 and 1986. After high school, Huisentruit went on to St. Cloud State University, where she studied mass communications and speech communication, graduating with a bachelor's degree in 1990. Huisentruit's first job after graduation was with Northwest Airlines. She began her broadcasting career with CBS affiliate KGAN in Cedar Rapids, Iowa, as the station's Iowa City bureau chief, then returned to Minnesota for a job at ABC affiliate KSAX in Alexandria. Huisentruit later returned to Iowa for her position at CBS affiliate KIMT in Mason City.

Disappearance
The day before her disappearance, Huisentruit participated in a golf tournament. According to Mason City resident John Vansice, she then went to his house to view a homemade videotape of a birthday celebration that he had arranged for her earlier that month.

At about 4:00 a.m. on Tuesday, June 27, 1995, KIMT producer Amy Kuns noticed that Huisentruit had failed to report to work as scheduled, so she called Huisentruit's apartment. When Huisentruit answered the telephone, she explained that she had overslept and that she was preparing to leave for the station. However, by 6:00 a.m. she had still not arrived, so Kuns filled in for her on the morning show Daybreak. At about 7:00 a.m., KIMT staff called the Mason City police.

When police arrived at Huisentruit's apartment, they found her red Mazda Miata in the parking lot, as well as other evidence that suggested a struggle had taken place near the car. Her personal items, including a bent car key, were strewn about the area, and police reported recovering an unidentified palm print from her vehicle.

Investigation
Investigators interviewed at least three neighbors in Huisentruit's apartment complex who said that they had heard screams at about the time that she would have likely been leaving for work. In addition, a nearby neighbor reported seeing a Mid-80s white Ford Econoline van parked with its lights on and engine running in Huisentruit's parking lot at about the same time.

In September 1995, the Huisentruit family hired private investigators from McCarthy & Associates Investigative Services, Inc. (MAIS) in Minneapolis, Minnesota, who in turn enlisted the assistance of Omaha, Nebraska, private investigator Doug Jasa. McCarthy and Jasa appeared on several national television shows, including America's Most Wanted and Unsolved Mysteries. In November 1995, they and members of Jodi's family traveled to Los Angeles, California, to meet with three prominent psychics. This meeting was televised and served as the pilot for the Psychic Detectives television show. Although each show generated several leads, none resulted in concrete evidence or identification of a suspect.

In May 1996, approximately 100 volunteers searched an area of Cerro Gordo County and left flags to mark anything that appeared suspicious. Each of these sites was then re-examined by law enforcement, but no promising evidence was located. Police and private investigators have conducted more than 1,000 interviews, but none have resulted in conclusive evidence pointing to a suspect. Huisentruit was declared legally dead in May 2001.

In 2003, FindJodi.com was created by Minnesota TV journalists Josh Benson and Gary Peterson with the goal to keep Jodi’s case in the spotlight and for the website to serve as a clearinghouse for tips that might lead to Jodi. 

When new cases arise that appear to bear similarities with Huisentruit's, or whenever remains are discovered in the area, speculation quickly leads to a connection with the missing reporter. However, no suspect has been identified and all uncovered remains to date have proven to be from other sources. In 2005, many media outlets, including 20/20, again focused on the story as the tenth anniversary of Huisentruit's disappearance approached.

In early June 2008, photocopies of the 84 pages of Huisentruit's personal journal were anonymously mailed to a local newspaper. The Mason City Globe Gazette received the material in a large envelope with no return address and a June 4 postmark from Waterloo. The original journal has been in the possession of law enforcement since the investigation began. Within days, Mason City Police reported that the sender had come forward and was identified as the wife of the former Mason City police chief. Although noting that the former chief had taken a copy of the journal home when he left office, the police gave no motive as to why the woman had sent it to the newspaper.

In May 2015, all 100 members of the Iowa House of Representatives signed a letter requesting Mason City to declare June 27, 2015, as Jodi Huisentruit Day in honor of her memory and that of all victims in unsolved cases. This was ultimately declined. In a December 2016 opinion piece for The N'West Iowa Review, retiring state representative John Kooiker of Sioux County described his experience with the case as a member of the Iowa State House Public Safety Committee and suggested a coverup by Mason City officials.

In March 2017, a search warrant was executed against John Vansice, seeking GPS data for two of his vehicles.

As of 2020, the Mason City Police Department and the Iowa Division of Criminal Investigation were still actively investigating Huisentruit's disappearance. That same year, Findjodi.com launched a podcast by the same name in order to gain a new audience to share information on the case and generate new leads.

In 2022, ABC's 20/20 debuted a new special titled "Gone at Dawn" overviewing the disappearance of Jodi and interviewing those close with the case. This episode was the third time 20/20 featured the Jodi Huisentruit case.

See also
 Jennifer Servo
 List of people who disappeared mysteriously

References

External links
Findjodi.com – search for Jodi Huisentruit conducted by journalists and investigators
Jodi Huisentruit at The Doe Network

1968 births
1990s missing person cases
American television journalists
American women television journalists
Iowa television reporters
Missing people
Missing person cases in Iowa
People declared dead in absentia
People from Mason City, Iowa
People from Long Prairie, Minnesota
St. Cloud State University alumni
Year of death unknown
Women in Iowa